KELT-3b is an extrasolar planet orbiting the F-type main-sequence star KELT-3 690 light years in the zodiac constellation Leo. It was discovered in 2013 by KELT's telescope in Arizona.

Properties 
This planet has 44% more mass than Jupiter, but has expanded to 1.34 times the radius of the latter. It has a temperature of 1,811 K, which gives it a Hot Jupiter class. KELT-3b has a lower density than Jupiter, and completes a revolution in less in 3 days. This corresponds with an orbital distance of 0.04 AU, which is 10 times closer than Mercury (planet) orbits the Sun.

The planetary equilibrium temperature is  1829 K, but measured temperature is hotter at 2132 K. The radiation of the moderately active host star KELT-3 do not produce a detectable ionization and consequent Lyman-alpha line emission in the atmosphere of the KELT-3b.

Discovery 
KELT-3b was discovered in 2013. The light curves and parameters of both the planet and the star were observed. The paper also states that there is uncertainty about the system age.

References 

Exoplanets discovered in 2012
Exoplanets discovered by KELT
Hot Jupiters
Leo (constellation)